Jiangxinpo is an area currently in Kachin State, Myanmar, located between the N'Mai and Mali Rivers, west of the Gaoligong Mountains of Yunnan, China. It was previously under the rule of the Qing dynasty of China.

In 1910, the British occupied Hpimaw (片马; Piànmǎ) in the Pianma Incident, as well as a part of what is now Northern Kachin state in 1926/7 and part of the Wa states in 1940. 

It was disputed territory between China and Myanmar until 1961, when the People's Republic of China (PRC) government recognized Myanmar's sovereignty over it. Some Chinese commentators, especially those in media in the Republic of China (Taiwan) and overseas which are outside the control of PRC government's censorship, criticized the PRC government for signing the agreement, which they regarded as guaranteeing the permanent loss of former Chinese territory to Myanmar.

See also 
 Campaign at the China–Burma border (1960–61)

References

China–Myanmar relations
Territorial disputes of the Republic of China
Qing dynasty
Territorial disputes of Myanmar